St. Aloysius College Nyapea is a boys-only boarding middle and high school located in Zombo District in the West Nile sub-region, in the Northern Region of Uganda. In the 1960s and 1970s the school was a seat of academic excellence. However, it fell on hard times in subsequent years, and as of 2018, was "a shadow of its former self".

Location
The geographical coordinates of the college are 02°27'31.0"N, 30°56'53.0"E (Latitude:2.458611 Longitude:30.948056).

History
The school was founded in 1938 in Gulu District by the Brothers of the Sacred Heart (American Brothers), and was later relocated to Nyapea in Zombo District.

In 2012, the government of Uganda allocated USh450 million (approx. US$180,000 at that time), to rehabilitate the school's dilapidated infrastructure. The funds were sourced from the African Development Bank under the  bank's AfDB Four Grant Project.

However, the renovations were botched as only part of the work was done and what was done was determined to be substandard. Since then the Uganda's State House has commissioned a forensic audit of the school renovations.

Recent developments
Supported by their Old Boys Association (Alumni Association), the school has started a slow academic comeback. Support comes in the form of student scholarships, mattresses, uniforms, books, and clothing.

Prominent alumni
Former students of Nyapea College include a former prime minister, current and former cabinet ministers, lawyers, academics, and sportsmen. Some of the prominent alumni of the school include:

 Kania Mario Obiga: Member of Parliament for Terego County East, Arua District in the 10th Parliament (2016—2021) and State Minister for Internal Affairs in the Ugandan Cabinet.
 George Cosmas Adyebo (18 June 1947–19 November 2000): Prime Minister of Uganda, from 22 January 1991 until 18 November 1994.
 Dr Amos Nyathirombo: Medical doctor, who successfully carried out research on River Blindness.
 Fred Omach: Former State Minister for Finance (General Duties) in the Cabinet of Uganda.

See also
 Education in Uganda
 List of schools in Uganda

References

External links
37 Hurt In Nyapea College Bullying As of 23 April 2004.

Boarding schools in Uganda
Educational institutions established in 1938
Boys' schools in Uganda
Secondary schools in Uganda
Education in Uganda
Zombo District
1938 establishments in the British Empire